Samuel Warren Abbott (June 12, 1837 – October 22, 1904) was an American surgeon with an interest in hygiene, born in Woburn, Massachusetts. In 1877, he helped inaugurate the first medical examiner system, in Massachusetts and became the first secretary of Massachusetts' first state board of health from 1886 to 1904.

He was born to army captain Samuel Abbott and Ruth Winn, attended Phillips Andover Academy, and graduated with a Master of Arts degree from Brown University in 1858. He attended Harvard Medical School, graduating in 1862.

Abbott died at his home in Newton, Massachusetts in 1904.

References

1837 births
1904 deaths
Brown University alumni
Harvard Medical School alumni
People from Woburn, Massachusetts
Phillips Academy alumni
Physicians from Massachusetts